Secret Healer, is a 2016 South Korean television series starring Yoon Shi-yoon, Kim Sae-ron, Lee Sung-jae, Yum Jung-ah and Kwak Si-yang. The story of the series is inspired by the book titled Dongui Bogam. It aired on cable network JTBC's Fridays and Saturdays at 20:30 (KST) time slot from May 13 to July 16, 2016 for 20 episodes.

Synopsis
Queen Shim (Jang Hee-jin), is a royal queen in the palace who, unable to have a child, seeks the help of a shaman named Hong-joo (Yum Jung-ah) to give birth to a prince. Hong-joo told Queen Shim to deceive a young shaman named Hae-ran (Jung In-seon) who possessed special abilities enabling her to sleep with the king so she can become pregnant. Hong-joo then uses black magic to transfer the fetus to the Queen and plans to kill Hae-ran. Unfortunately, Hae-ran finds out everything, predicting the sad fate of the Queen's babies before dying. Queen Shim later gives birth to twins, Crown Prince Soonhwae (Yeo Hoe-hyun) and princess Yeon-hee (Kim Sae-ron), but was forced to abandon the princess due to the curse. With the help of Shaman Choi Hyun-seo (Lee Sung-jae), Yeon-hee grows up as a beautiful young girl, but she is forced to remain isolated and away from everyone, living in a house surrounded by talismans. Poong-yeon (Kwak Si-yang), Hyun-seo's son, has had a crush on her since he was young. A young scholar named Heo Jun (Yoon Shi-yoon), the son of a slave and a rich master, has a chance encounter with Yeon-hee and Heo Jun ties their fate as they journey together to lift the princess' curse which causes everyone she loves to die an awful death.

Cast

Main
 Yoon Shi-yoon as Heo Jun
 Kim Sae-ron as Princess Seo-ri / Yeon-hee
 Lee Sung-jae as Choi Hyun-seo
 Yum Jung-ah as Shaman Choi Hong-joo
 Kwak Si-yang as Poong-yeon

Supporting

Royal household
 Jang Hee-jin as Queen Shim
 Lee Ji-hoon as King Seonjo
 Yeo Hoe-hyun as Crown Prince Soonhwoe

People of Sogyeokseo
 Lee Yi-kyung as Yo-kwang
 N/A as Cheon-choo
 N/A as Cheon-kwon
 N/A as Ok-hyung
 N/A as Gae-yang

Heo Jun's family
  as Heo Ok
 N/A as Heo Yoon

Extended

 Moon Ga-young as Sol-gae, Poong-yeon's confidant and escort warrior
 Min Do-hee as Soon-deuk, Heo Jun's assistant
 Choi Sung-won as Dong-rae, the one and only friend of Heo-jun also a merchant from Sangdan
 Hwang Young-hee as Ms. Jeong	
  as So-yaeng
 Kim Seo-yeon as an escort maid
 Kim Chae-eun as Moo-mae
 Song Jae-in as a Ginyeo
  as Hwa-jin
  as Mi-hyang
 Kim Jong-hoon as Bat-soe
 Kim Yong-ho
 Kim Won-jin
 
 Song Yong-ho
 Kim Seung-pil
 Lee Ga-kyung
 Go Eun-min
 Song Kyung-hwa
 
 Lee Gyu-bok
 Nam Tae-boo
 Kwon Hyeok-soo
 Moon Soo-jong
 Yoo Il-han
 Seok Bo-bae
 Jang Yong-cheol
 Ahn Min-sang
 Park Se-jin
 Yoo Seung-il
 Seol Joo-mi

Special appearances

 Kim Young-ae as Queen Yoon
 Lee David as King Myeongjong
 Jung In-sun as Hae-ran, Seo-ri's mother
 Yoon Bok-in as Mrs. Ok, Poong-yeon's mother
 Jeon Mi-seon as Mrs. Son, Heo Jun's stepmother
 Kim Hee-jung as Mrs. Kim
  as Jong Sa-gwan
 Lee Cho-hee as Kisaeng Man-wol
 Park Chul-min as a People in Sadang
  as Too Jun-kkoon
 Kang Han-na as Queen Park
 Kim Kap-soo as Heo Jun after 40 years
 Ahn Gil-kang as a Mysterious man
 Nam Da-reum as Heo Jun's disciple

Ratings
In this table,  represent the lowest ratings and  represent the highest ratings.

Original soundtrack

OST Part 1

OST Part 2

OST Part 3

OST Part 4

Remark
Episode 7 wasn't aired on Friday June 3 due to broadcast of the 52nd Paeksang Arts Awards. This episode would be aired on Saturday June 4, the same day with episode 8.

Awards and nominations

Notes

References

External links
 
 Secret Healer at Apollo Pictures 
 Secret Healer at Drama House
 Secret Healer at Media N Art
 
 Secret Healer at Daum 
 

Korean-language television shows
2016 South Korean television series debuts
2016 South Korean television series endings
JTBC television dramas
Television series set in the Joseon dynasty
South Korean fantasy television series
South Korean historical television series
Television series by Drama House